
Desmond Tutu (born 29 September 1997) is a Solomon Islands footballer who plays as a goalkeeper for the Henderson Eels in the Telekom S-League and the Solomon Islands national football team.

Club
Tutu started his career at the same club where he made his debut: Kossa. In 2016, he was drafted into the first team and he soon became a regular in the starting lineup. In 2018 he moved to Henderson Eels to play with them in the OFC Champions League.

International
Tutu was called up for the Solomon Islands national football team by Spanish head coach Felipe Vega-Arango for the 2017 Pacific Mini Games from 2 to 15 December. He made his debut on 2 December 2017 in an 8–0 victory over Tonga national football team. Tutu played the whole 90 minutes. Besides Tonga he also played against Fiji, New Caledonia and Vanuatu during the Pacific Games.

Personal life
Tutu was named after Desmond Tutu, the South African Anglican cleric and theologian known for his work as an anti-apartheid and human rights activist.

References

1997 births
Living people

Association football goalkeepers

Solomon Islands international footballers
Solomon Islands footballers